is a passenger railway station in located in the city of  Kyōtango, Kyoto Prefecture, Japan, operated by the private railway company Willer Trains (Kyoto Tango Railway).

Lines
Kabutoyama Station is a station of the Miyazu Line, and is located 69.7 kilometers from the terminus of the line at Nishi-Maizuru Station.

Station layout
The station has one ground-level side platform serving a single bi-directional track. The station is unattended.This is the only station on the Miyazu Line that has no station building except for the shelter on the platform.

Adjacent stations

History

Passenger statistics
In fiscal 2018, the station was used by an average of 71 passengers daily.

Surrounding area
 Japan National Route 178
 Kawakamitani River
 Kabutoyama Observatory
 Kinoshita Sake Brewery

See also
List of railway stations in Japan

References

External links

Official home page 

Railway stations in Kyoto Prefecture
Railway stations in Japan opened in 1962
Kyōtango